Ali Qorbanzadeh is an Iranian actor.  He became interested in acting at the age of 15. He started working in entertainment in animation, and directed his first animated film at the age of 16. At the age of 19 he started acting in live action, and directed yet another animation short film called Dokhtaram (My Daughter) at the age of 21, starring Iranian veteran actor Reza Kianian. Though Qorbanzadeh has not academically studied acting, but his vast resume and his wide spectrum of roles he has played makes him a recognizable name and face amongst Iranian audiences. Qorbanzadeh is a much sought-after actor among Iranian directors, though in recent years he has worked mainly with leading director Saman Moghadam (Maxx, Ghalbe Yakhi). Together, Moghadam and Qorbanzadeh have produced three features and two series.

Filmography

Films

Television

Photography 

Ali Qorbanzadeh is also a professional photographer. His work has been exhibited in various photography shows, including IPA International Photo Award in New York City in 2010.

References

External links
 

1978 births
Living people
Iranian male film actors
Iranian male television actors
20th-century Iranian male actors
21st-century Iranian male actors